Robert Gordon Switz (born 1904) was a "wealthy American who converted to communism" and served as spy for Soviet Military Intelligence ("GRU").

Background

Robert Gordon Switz was born in 1904 in East Orange, New Jersey, the son of Theodore Switz, a naturalized Russian, and Genevieve Switz.  He attended Mercersburg Academy but did not go to college.  Instead, in 1922, he shipped out as seaman to Germany, which he toured.

Career 

Switz went abroad again to France, where he obtained an airplane pilot's license, then trained at Roosevelt Field (airport) on Long Island.

Some time during the 1920s, Switz joined the Communist Party USA and then the GRU (Soviet Military Intelligence) in the early 1930s.  In New York, they worked in a network that included Lydia Stahl and Paulne Jacobson-Levine (later recounted in the 1952 memoir of Whittaker Chambers).

In early 1933, Switz was involved in turning an American soldier, Robert Osman, stationed in Panama Canal Zone, via a "honey trap" - Frema Karry, a young Russian girl in Switz's network. Osman provided war plans.  He was arrested, represented by socialist lawyer Louis Waldman (later lawyer for Walter Krivitsky), and imprisoned for 25 years. Switz escaped unnamed at the time.  In July 1933, Switz was reassigned to a Paris-based network led by "Markovich."  He went to live in Paris as a sales representative for the MacNeil Instrument Company:  the company's president J.N.A. Van Ven Bonwhuizsen later said, "He never made any sales."

As a spy in Paris for the Soviets, Switz's role in espionage was to "gather French defense information for the benefit of Soviet intelligence." In December 1933, French intelligence arrested Switz in his apartment on the Rue de la Chaussée d'Antin (near the Paris Opera).  Most of the information collected concerned French armaments, and was a form of industrial espionage.  It included nearly $3,800, letters from the French Ministry of War, and eggshells, each pierced on one end.  His arrest led to the arrest of 29 others, including Stahl and Romanian spy Octave Dumoulin. Switz escaped prosecution by cooperating with investigators from La Sûreté nationale.  The trial occurred in March 1935.

In October 1933, Finnish-American Arvid Jacobson  was arrested in Finland, whose government declared the Jacobson and Switz belonged to the same Soviet network between United States, Canada, France, Sweden, Norway, Estonia, and Latvia.

On September 27–28, 1948, and again on February 27 and March 1, 1950, Switz testified before the House Un-American Activities Committee.

Personal life

In 1929, brother Paul F. Switz was a star football player at Yale University and later an economist.  Brother Theodore Switz was a chemical economist at Lehman Corporation .

In 1933, Switz married Marjorie Tilley, daughter of Bertha Tilley and graduate of Vassar College.

Legacy

The Switz case ran concurrently with a scandal in France over Ukrainian born embezzler Alexandre Stavisky.

"L'affaire Switz" offset any Soviet gains in intelligence into the French military with embarrassment for the USSR as well as the French Communist Party ("PCF").

See also 

 Lydia Stahl

References

External sources

 British National Archives: Robert Gordon SWITZ / Marjorie Tilley SWITZ
William T. Murphy,"The Honeymoon Spies: Robert Gordon Switz and Marjorie Tilley," American Intelligence Journal, 36:1 (2019),75-98.

American communists of the Stalin era
American communists